International Socialist Review  may refer to:
International Socialist Review (1900), a defunct American socialist journal associated with the Socialist Party of America
International Socialist Review (1956), a defunct American socialist journal published by the United States Socialist Workers Party
International Socialist Review (1997), a defunct (2019) American socialist journal published by the Center for Economic Research and Social Change (CERSC)

See also
 International Socialism (magazine), a British-based quarterly socialist journal published by the Socialist Workers Party